The Arizona Library Association (AzLA) is a professional organization for Arizona's librarians and library workers. It is headquartered in Tucson, AZ. It was founded on November 12, 1926, in Phoenix, by Estelle Lutrell and State Librarian Con Cronin. Cronin was elected the organization's first president. Lutrell was secretary of AzLA from 1926–1930 and elected president in 1931.

AzLA has developed statewide materials purchasing contracts, provides continuing education credits for school librarians, and creates regional forums for obtaining statewide input to the association. AzLA is a sponsor the Horner Fellowship (est. 1989) and the Snowbird Leadership Institute, for younger librarians. AzLA publishes the AzLA Newsletter (ISSN 0515-0272).

References

External links
 Arizona Library Association website

arizona
Organizations based in Arizona
Libraries in Arizona